Sulphur Passage Provincial Park is a provincial park in British Columbia, Canada, located in the central part of the Clayoquot Sound region of the West Coast of Vancouver Island, British Columbia, Canada.  It is located around Obstruction Island to the northeast of Flores Island.  The eponymous Sulphur Passage is located on the east side Obstruction Island.

See also
Clayoquot Sound Biosphere Reserve

References

Clayoquot Sound region
Provincial parks of British Columbia
Protected areas established in 1995
1995 establishments in British Columbia